Stuart Brehaut (born 24 September 1978) is a badminton player from Australia.

Brehaut played badminton at the 2004 Summer Olympics in men's singles, losing comprehensively in the first round to Lee Hyun-il of Korea 15–3 15–2.

He competed in both the 1998, 2002, 2006 Commonwealth Games, achieving a fifth-place finish in the 2002 teams event. At the 2006 Games in Kuala Lumpur he competed alongside his brother Ashley Brehaut.

References

External links
 
 
 
 
 
 
 

1978 births
Living people
Australian male badminton players
Badminton players at the 2004 Summer Olympics
Olympic badminton players of Australia
Badminton players at the 1998 Commonwealth Games
Badminton players at the 2002 Commonwealth Games
Commonwealth Games competitors for Australia